Amir Beyg (also Romanized as Amīr Beyg; also known as Amīr Beyg-e Soflá) is a village in Rahal Rural District, in the Central District of Khoy County, West Azerbaijan Province, Iran. At the 2006 census, its population was 72, in 17 families.

References 

Populated places in Khoy County